Haematostemon is a genus of plant of the family Euphorbiaceae first described as a genus in 1919. It is native to northeastern South America (Guyana and S Venezuela).

Species
 Haematostemon coriaceus (Baill.) Pax & K.Hoffm. - Amazonas State in S Venezuela
 Haematostemon guianensis  Sandwith - Potaro-Siparuni region of Guyana

References

Plukenetieae
Flora of South America
Euphorbiaceae genera